Hasharabad or Hasherabad or Hashrabad may refer to:
 Hasharabad, Bam
 Hasharabad, Jiroft
 Hasharabad, Rigan